Charles or Charlie Grant may refer to:

Arts and entertainment
 Charles Jameson Grant, American editorial cartoonist
 Charles L. Grant (1942–2006), American novelist
 Charles Grant (actor) (born 1957), American actor

 Charles Grant (dancer), a featured dancer at the Eleo Pomare Dance Company
 Charles Grant (game designer) (died 1979), Scottish game author

Military
 Charles Grant (Royal Navy officer) (1770–1824), Royal Navy Commodore
 Charles James William Grant (1861–1932), Scottish recipient of the Victoria Cross
 Charles Grant (British Army officer) (1877–1950), British Army General

Politics
 Charles Grant (British East India Company) (1746–1823), British politician
 Charles Grant, 1st Baron Glenelg (1778–1866), Scottish politician
 Charles Henry Grant (1831–1901), engineer and politician in colonial Tasmania (Australia)
 Charles Grant (Australian politician) (1878–1943), Australian Senator

Fictional Characters
Charles Grant, fictional character Fantastic Voyage

Others
 Charles William Grant, 5th Baron de Longueuil (1782–1848)
 Charles Colmore Grant, 7th Baron de Longueuil (1844–1898)
 Charlie Grant (1874–1932), American baseball player, also known as "Charlie Tokohama"
 Charlie Grant (activist) (1902–1980), Canadian human rights activist
 Charles Grant (bishop) (1906–1989), English prelate of the Roman Catholic Church
 Charles Grant (American football) (born 1978), American football player

Other uses
 Charles Grant (1810 EIC ship), built at Bombay for the British East India Company

See also